Johannnes Schätzl (born 10 June 1993) is a German politician of the Social Democratic Party (SPD) who has been serving as a member of the Bundestag since 2021.

Political career
Schätzl was elected to the Bundestag in 2021, representing the Passau district. In parliament, he has since been serving on the Committee on Digital Affairs and the Committee on Food and Agriculture.

Other activities 
 Federal Network Agency for Electricity, Gas, Telecommunications, Post and Railway (BNetzA), Member of the Advisory Board (since 2022)

References

Living people
1993 births
People from Bavaria
Social Democratic Party of Germany politicians
Members of the Bundestag 2021–2025
21st-century German politicians